Dastja (also Romanized as Dastjā and Dastejā; also known as Dastjā’ and Dastjāh) is a village in Baraan-e Shomali Rural District, in the Central District of Isfahan County, Isfahan Province, Iran. At the 2006 census, its population was 1,704, in 374 families.

References 

Populated places in Isfahan County